WTWP Classical Talkity-Talk Radio was released in 1991 by Telarc Records. The album contains the "last hour of the broadcast from station WTWP in Hoople on May 5, 1991, the 184th anniversary of the death of P. D. Q. Bach." The station name WTWP means "Wall to Wall Pachelbel" in which some unusual instruments play his Canon in D.

Towards the middle of the repeat of the Canon, Blondie suffers a nervous breakdown, being the result of an overdose of Pachebel.

Performers
Professor Peter Schickele
Donna Brown as Blondie
Elliott Forrest as Jocko
Dana Krueger, mezzanine-soprano
Peter Lurye, piano
Enos Presley, Elvis Presley's younger brother
Members of the Cleveland Orchestra
Calliope, a renaissance band

Track listing
Getting ready
Theme song - Opening 
Canzon Per Sonar a Sei — Count Them — Sei (P.D.Q. Bach)
Pledge plea
Four Folk Song Upsettings, S. 4 (P.D.Q. Bach)
"Little Bunny Hop Hop Hop"
"Oft of an E'en Ere Night is Nigh"
"He Came From Over Yonder Ridge"
"The Farmer on the Dole"
Station ID
Classical Kwickie-Kwiz
"Sam and Janet" (P.D.Q. Bach)
Weather report
Hound Dog (Leiber & Stoller)
 Flip side intro
Love Me (Leiber & Stoller)
 Station ID
 Cadenza
"Safe" Sextet, S. R33–L45–R(pass it once)78 (P.D.Q. Bach)
Oo-La-La intro
Oo-La-La: Cookin' French Like the French Cook French
Station ID
Canzonetta intro
Canzonetta "La Hooplina" (The Girl from Hoople) S. 16 going on 30 (P.D.Q. Bach)
Wrap-up
Theme song (Pachelbel's Canon)

Sources

P. D. Q. Bach albums
1991 albums
Grammy Award for Best Comedy Album
Concept albums
1990s comedy albums